Elijah Williams may refer to:

 Elijah Williams (chess player) (1809–1854), British chess player
 Elijah Williams (American football) (born 1975), former American football player